List of airports in Irkutsk Oblast (Russian Federation).

 
Irkutsk Oblast